The Discovery Women's Basketball Invitational is an international basketball tournament in the Philippines.

History
In 2011, the inaugural invitational was contested by the women's national teams of the Philippines and Qatar along with Bangkok Bank of Thailand and a selection team from Fujian of China. The tournament hosted by Bacolod took place at the West Negros University Gym from September 28-October 1.

In 2013, the Discovery Invitational was known as "Jesse Robredo Memorial Cup" to commemorate the first death anniversary of former Department of the Interior and Local Government secretary Jesse Robredo, was an invitational basketball team which was contested by the women's national teams of the Philippines and Singapore, along with a Gold Coast All Stars team assembled by Gold Coast Basketball of Australia. India was also invited to partake at the tournament but did not send its team due to a ban imposed on its National Olympic Committee by the International Olympic Committee at that time which took effect in December 2012. The tournament was held in Naga City from August 22–25, 2013 at the Jesse Robredo Coliseum.

In 2015, the invitational was held once again and was contested by the women's national teams of the Philippines, Turkmenistan, and Team A and B of Papua New Guinea. The games took place in Davao City at the Almendras Gym Davao City Recreation Center.

Results

Medal tally

By country

By club/team

Participation details

References

 
Women's basketball competitions in Asia between national teams
International women's basketball competitions hosted by the Philippines
Recurring sporting events established in 2011
2011 establishments in the Philippines
Philippines women's national basketball team